New York's 116th State Assembly district is one of the 150 districts in the New York State Assembly. It has been represented by Scott Gray since 2023.

Geography
District 116 contains portions of St. Lawrence and Jefferson counties. It largely borders the St. Lawrence River, hence the district being colloquially called the "River District".

Recent election results

2022

2020

2018

2016

2014

2012

References 

St. Lawrence County, New York
Jefferson County, New York
116